Eric Stark Maskin (born December 12, 1950) is an American economist and mathematician. He was jointly awarded the 2007 Nobel Memorial Prize in Economic Sciences with Leonid Hurwicz and Roger Myerson "for having laid the foundations of mechanism design theory". He is the Adams University Professor and Professor of Economics and Mathematics at Harvard University.

Until 2011, he was the Albert O. Hirschman Professor of Social Science at the Institute for Advanced Study, and a visiting lecturer with the rank of professor at Princeton University.

Early life and education
Maskin was born in New York City on December 12, 1950, into a Jewish family, and spent his youth in Alpine, New Jersey. He graduated from Tenafly High School in Tenafly, New Jersey, in 1968. In 1972, he graduated with A.B. in mathematics from Harvard College, the undergraduate liberal arts college of Harvard University. In 1974, he earned A.M. in applied mathematics and in 1976 earned a Ph.D. in applied mathematics, both at Harvard University. In 1975-76, he was a visiting student at Darwin College, Cambridge University.

Career and topics
In 1976, after earning his doctorate, Maskin became a research fellow at Jesus College, Cambridge University. In the following year, he joined the faculty at Massachusetts Institute of Technology. In 1985 he returned to Harvard as the Louis Berkman Professor of Economics, where he remained until 2000. That year, he moved to the Institute for Advanced Study in Princeton, New Jersey. In addition to his position at the Princeton Institute, Maskin is the director of the Jerusalem Summer School in Economic Theory at The Institute for Advanced Studies at The Hebrew University of Jerusalem. In 2010, he was conferred an honorary doctoral degree in economics from The University of Cambodia. In 2011, Maskin returned to Harvard as the Adams University Professor and professor of economics and mathematics.

Maskin has worked in diverse areas of economic theory, such as game theory, the economics of incentives, and contract theory. He is particularly known for his papers on mechanism design/implementation theory and dynamic games. With Jean Tirole, he advanced the concept of Markov perfect equilibrium. His research projects include comparing different electoral rules, examining the causes of inequality, and studying coalition formation.

Maskin is a Fellow of the American Academy of Arts and Sciences, Econometric Society, and the European Economic Association, and a Corresponding Fellow of the British Academy. He was president of the Econometric Society in 2003.

In 2014, Maskin was appointed as a visiting professor at Covenant University, Nigeria.

In September 2017, Maskin received the title of HEC Paris Honoris Causa Professor. He also served on the Social Sciences jury for the Infosys Prize in 2018. 

Furthermore, he is the chairman of the board of trustees of the International Economics Olympiad.

Along with Ned Foley, he has proposed the use of Baldwin's voting method, under the name "Total Vote Runoff", as a way to fix problems with the instant-runoff method ("Ranked Choice Voting") in US jurisdictions that use it, ensuring majority support of the winner and electing more broadly-acceptable candidates.

Software patents
Maskin suggested that software patents inhibit innovation rather than stimulate progress. Software, semiconductor, and computer industries have been innovative despite historically weak patent protection, he argued. Innovation in those industries has been sequential and complementary, so competition can increase firms' future profits. In such a dynamic industry, "patent protection may reduce overall innovation and social welfare". A natural experiment occurred in the 1980s when patent protection was extended to software", wrote Maskin with co-author James Bessen. "Standard arguments would predict that R&D intensity and productivity should have increased among patenting firms. Consistent with our model, however, these increases did not occur". Other evidence supporting this model includes a distinctive pattern of cross-licensing and a positive relationship between rates of innovation and firm entry.

See also
 List of economists
 Mechanism design

References

External links

  including the Nobel prize Lecture Mechanism Design: How to Implement Social Goals
 Profile in The Daily Princetonian
 Videos of Eric Maskin

 Maskin giving a keynote address on 'How to Make the Right Decisions without knowing People's Preferences'

1950 births
Living people
Nobel laureates in Economics
American Nobel laureates
Fellows of the American Academy of Arts and Sciences
Corresponding Fellows of the British Academy
Fellows of the Econometric Society
Members of the United States National Academy of Sciences
Game theorists
Harvard College alumni
Harvard University alumni
Harvard University faculty
Information economists
Institute for Advanced Study faculty
Jewish American social scientists
Massachusetts Institute of Technology faculty
People from Alpine, New Jersey
Princeton University faculty
Fellows of Jesus College, Cambridge
Fellows of Churchill College, Cambridge
Presidents of the Econometric Society
Jewish American economists
20th-century American economists
21st-century American economists
Academic staff of Covenant University
Santa Fe Institute people
Tenafly High School alumni
Economists from New Jersey
Nancy L. Schwartz Memorial Lecture speakers
Fellows of the European Economic Association